Peter Alan Gruner Jr. (born May 11, 1974) is an American retired professional wrestler, better known by his ring name Billy Kidman. He most recently worked for WWE as a producer.

As a wrestler, Kidman is best known for his work with World Championship Wrestling (WCW) and World Wrestling Federation / Entertainment (WWF/E) throughout the late 1990s and early 2000s. While in WCW, Kidman gained fame as a key member of several stables. In addition to being a member of Raven's Flock, he also was a member of The Filthy Animals and later The New Blood. As a member of these stables, Kidman participated in memorable feuds with top WCW names, including Hulk Hogan, Jeff Jarrett, and Rey Mysterio Kidman also found championship success while in WCW, where he became a three time Cruiserweight Champion, a two time World Tag Team Champion (once with Mysterio Jr. and once with Konnan) and a one time (and the final) Cruiserweight Tag Team Champion with Mysterio Jr.

Upon WCW's purchase by the World Wrestling Federation, Kidman became a member of the WCW/ECW Alliance. During his time in the WWF (later renamed to World Wrestling Entertainment), Kidman once again found success upon winning the Cruiserweight Championship an additional four times while the title was under the WCW banner and later the WWF/E banner, in addition to winning WWE's Tag Team Championship once with Paul London.

Early life and education
Gruner grew up in Allentown, Pennsylvania in the Lehigh Valley region of eastern Pennsylvania, where he graduated from Parkland High School. Gruner was a banker before he started training to be a professional wrestler and was good friends with fellow professional wrestler Chris Kanyon, who he met at the Wild Samoan training center in Pennsylvania. He is a cousin of fellow professional wrestler Mikey Batts.

Professional wrestling career

Early career (1994–1996)

Gruner was trained by Afa Anoaʻi, one half of The Wild Samoans, and wrestled his first match on September 11, 1994 in Hellertown, Pennsylvania against "Wild Thing" Dan Kallis on the independent circuit as Kid Flash. He formed a tag team with Ace Darling known as The Shooting Stars, and they would find success by winning the ECWA Tag Team Championship.

World Championship Wrestling (1996–2001)

The Flock (1996–1998)

Gruner first started wrestling as Billy Kidman, or simply Kidman, for World Championship Wrestling in mid-1996, where he spent over a year as an enhancement talent with no character. In 1997, Kidman was added to Raven's Flock and to fit in with the Flock's gimmick of being outcasts, Kidman was given the gimmick of a heroin addict, where he constantly scratched his arms and named his shooting star press the Seven Year Itch. Kidman found little personal success with the group and aided Perry Saturn in defeating Raven in a match, thus disbanding the group.

Cruiserweight Champion (1998–1999) 
Following the Flock's disbanding, Kidman shed his grungy attire and heroin gimmick and began performing as a clean-cut fan favorite before eventually defeating Juventud Guerrera to win his first Cruiserweight Championship. Although Guerrera won the title back a few weeks later, Kidman would regain it at World War 3 in Auburn Hills, Michigan. Kidman eventually lost the title on an episode of Nitro to Rey Mysterio.

Following this, Mysterio asked Kidman to be his tag team partner in a match for the World Tag Team Championship. Kidman at first declined, as a previous attempt at a tag team between the two did not reach any level of success. The two, however, faced Chris Benoit and Dean Malenko for the titles and succeeded with unwanted aid from Raven and Saturn.  Kidman then faced off against Mysterio in an attempt to win back the Cruiserweight Championship at Spring Stampede, however, Mysterio retained his title.
The three teams feuded for several weeks, which ended in a three-way tag team match for the titles. Chris Kanyon's interference led to the victory for Raven and Saturn. Kidman spent the next several months in assorted feuds. He won the Cruiserweight Championship one more time from Prince Iaukea at a house show, but lost it to Iaukea one day later. Kidman also defeated Psicosis in a hair vs. mask match, and came close to defeating Jeff Jarrett for the United States Heavyweight Championship.

Filthy Animals (1999–2001) 

During this time, Kidman joined Filthy Animals alongside Rey Mysterio, Konnan, and Eddie Guerrero. Guerrero left the group when he left WCW, and Kidman left the stable when the rest of its members turned heel. He later rejoined the Animals when they turned face once again during the last few months of WCW's existence.

Following his first departure from the Filthy Animals, Kidman joined Vince Russo's New Blood stable, signalling another heel turn. Reflecting the gimmick of the New Blood, Kidman began acting as hotshot who refused to be held back by wrestlers beyond their prime. This led to the biggest feud of his career with Hulk Hogan, defeating him in three matches in a row. After the New Blood split up, Kidman became a face once more by entering a feud with Shane Douglas for the affection of his on-screen girlfriend Torrie Wilson. During the feud, Wilson turned on Kidman. Kidman was legitimately injured in a match at New Blood Rising in August 2000, when in a strap match, Douglas hung Kidman from the neck using the strap, and was forced to take several weeks off to recover.

Following the Douglas feud, Kidman began teaming with Mysterio Jr. again. They entered the Cruiserweight Tag Team Championship tournament, but lost in the finals to Elix Skipper and Kid Romeo. On the final episode of Nitro, Kidman and Mysterio Jr. won the title from Skipper and Romeo. That night, the World Wrestling Federation (WWF) purchased WCW and Kidman's contract was picked up by the WWF.

World Wrestling Federation/Entertainment (2001 - 2005)

Cruiserweight Championship pursuit (2001–2003)
When the WWF purchased WCW, the contract of Gruner (who was still wrestling as Billy Kidman) was one of twenty-five involved in the purchase. When The Invasion commenced, Gruner appeared on WWF television under his Billy Kidman ring name as a tweener for The Alliance. In July 2001, he won the Cruiserweight Championship from Gregory Helms in the first televised WCW match on SmackDown!. As the WCW Cruiserweight Champion, Kidman proceeded to defeat the WWF Light Heavyweight Champion X-Pac at Invasion. After this, Kidman was later sidelined with an injury during the Invasion angle and thus did not have as big of an impact as other WCW wrestlers. On the October 11 episode of SmackDown!, Kidman won his record-tying fifth Cruiserweight Championship after defeating X-Pac.

Following the end of The Alliance, Kidman turned fan favorite and was subsequently drafted to SmackDown! as part of the brand extension. In his return match, Kidman defeated Tajiri to win his record-breaking sixth Cruiserweight Championship. However, Tajiri reclaimed the title at Backlash. At Rebellion, Kidman and his real-life girlfriend Torrie Wilson defeated John Cena and Dawn Marie in an intergender tag team match. After this, he went on to win his record-breaking seventh Cruiserweight Championship after defeating Jamie Noble at Survivor Series. He later lost the title three months later to Matt Hardy at No Way Out.

Teaming and feuding with Paul London (2004–2005)

Following the title loss, Kidman proceeded to spend the next few years as a cornerstone of the cruiserweight division before forming a tag team with newcomer Paul London in early 2004. Together, they slowly worked their way up the tag team ranks before ultimately winning the Tag Team Championship from the Dudley Boyz on the July 8, 2004 episode of SmackDown!. Proving the win was not an upset, they went on to defeat the Dudley Boyz in a rematch for the title.

Their championship run came to an abrupt end after Kidman turned his back on London. The heel turn played off of a legitimate injury which occurred on an August 24, 2004 taping of SmackDown!, when Kidman's shooting star press unintentionally caused Chavo Guerrero Jr. to suffer a concussion. The next week, Kidman was on the top rope ready to hit the shooting star press, but hesitated, climbed down the turnbuckles, and slowly walked backstage overwhelmed with guilt after injuring Guerrero. London was left alone to defend the title against Kenzo Suzuki and René Duprée, and was easily defeated. As a result, London and Kidman faced each other at No Mercy, where Kidman defeated London before performing the shooting star press on London while he was strapped to a stretcher. This completed Kidman's heel turn, as he proceeded to blame the fans for wanting him to be more brutal with his in-ring style. Kidman and Guerrero ended their feud upon Chavo's return, the latter being victorious in the final match. Kidman then competed against London over the Cruiserweight Championship in the coming months. At the start of 2005, Kidman suffered a broken orbital bone, which sidelined him for three months.

Gruner was released from his WWE contract on July 6, 2005. Gruner stated that the release was due to an argument with management over their decision to stop booking wrestlers on first class flights overseas.

Independent circuit (2005–2007)
Following his departure from WWE, Kidman began touring the United Kingdom. During the tour, he competed for the Frontier Wrestling Alliance in a three-way match with Jody Fleisch and Jonny Storm. He also wrestled British wrestling legend Robbie Brookside in a losing effort to determine the inaugural Real Quality Wrestling Heavyweight Champion.

In 2007, Kidman made his International Wrestling Association debut in a match for the IWA World Heavyweight Championship against Ray González, which he lost. Kidman also took part in the East Coast Australian International Assault II Tour from June 1–3, 2007, where he competed against Australian wrestlers TNT and Mark Hilton before defeating Bryan Danielson to win the WSW World Heavyweight Championship on the third night in Newcastle.

On July 8, 2007, Kidman teamed up with Sean Waltman as part of a triple threat match in McAllen, Texas to crown the new NWA World Tag Team Champions. The title was previously vacated by Team 3D after Total Nonstop Action Wrestling officially pulled out of the National Wrestling Alliance. However, Kidman and Waltman lost the match to Karl Anderson and Joey Ryan.

Return to WWE (2007–2022)
Kidman returned to WWE in 2007, helping train upcoming wrestlers in its then developmental territory Florida Championship Wrestling throughout 2007 and 2008. On February 23, 2008, he wrestled his last match, losing to Afa Jr. Gruner was rehired by World Wrestling Entertainment in 2010 as a producer. On September 21, 2011, WWE ran a story on their website about Gruner and his role as a producer.

On April 9, 2012, Gruner along with former wrestlers Jamie Noble, Goldust and other officials and WWE wrestlers broke up the brawl between John Cena and Brock Lesnar. In November 2013, Gruner appeared on WWE's European tour as Paul Heyman's doctor, under the name of "Dr. Weisenburg". On August 23, 2016 episode of SmackDown Live, he appeared along with Jamie Noble to prevent Dolph Ziggler from attacking AJ Styles.

Kidman's contract was furloughed by the company on April 15, 2020, due to COVID-19 cutbacks. He returned on September 25, 2020. However, in 2022 (or earlier), Kidman left WWE.

Personal life
Gruner is Jewish. After being together for four years, Gruner married former WWE Diva Torrie Wilson on July 11, 2003. They lived together in Tampa, Florida when not traveling. The couple separated in mid-2006 and divorced in 2008.

A book detailing Gruner's career, Billy Kidman: The Shooting Star, was released in early 2014.

In 2014, Kidman began appearing on The JBL Show, where he attempts to promote his Twitter page but is always interrupted due to technical difficulties, which has become a running gag on the show.

Championships and awards
East Coast Wrestling Association
ECWA Tag Team Championship (1 time) – with Ace Darling
ECWA Hall of Fame (Class of 2004)
Pro Wrestling Illustrated
Ranked No. 31 of the 500 best singles wrestlers of the year in PWI 500 in 1999
 Ranked No. 313 of the top 500 singles wrestlers in the "PWI Years" in 2003
Revolution Xtreme Wrestling
RXW World Heavyweight Championship (1 time)
Trans-World Wrestling Federation
TWWF Cruiserweight Championship (1 time)
World Championship Wrestling
WCW Cruiserweight Championship (3 times)
WCW Cruiserweight Tag Team Championship (1 time) – with Rey Mysterio Jr.
WCW World Tag Team Championship (2 times) – with Rey Mysterio Jr. (1) and  Konnan (1)
World Series Wrestling
WSW World Heavyweight Championship (1 time)
World Wrestling Federation/Entertainment
WCW/WWF/E Cruiserweight Championship (4 times)
WWE Tag Team Championship (1 time) – with Paul London
Wrestling Observer Newsletter
Worst Feud of the Year (2000)

Bibliography
Carrington, L. Anne (2014).  Billy Kidman: The Shooting Star. Palm Tree Books

See also
 List of Jewish professional wrestlers

References

External links 

 
 
 
 

1974 births
American male professional wrestlers
Jewish American sportspeople
Jewish professional wrestlers
Living people
Parkland High School (Pennsylvania) alumni
Sportspeople from Tampa, Florida
Sportspeople from Allentown, Pennsylvania
Professional wrestlers from Pennsylvania
Professional wrestling trainers
21st-century American Jews
20th-century professional wrestlers
21st-century professional wrestlers
WCW/WWE Cruiserweight Champions
WCW World Tag Team Champions